Louis Hon (11 September 1924 – 5 January 2008) was a French professional footballer and coach.

External links
 Profile
 
 Obituary, Marca.com
 Obituary, UEFA.com

1924 births
2008 deaths
Sportspeople from Saône-et-Loire
French footballers
Footballers from Bourgogne-Franche-Comté
Association football defenders
France international footballers
French football managers
La Liga managers
Real Zaragoza managers
Real Betis managers
RC Celta de Vigo managers
Olympique Lyonnais managers
Angers SCO managers
Stade Français (association football) players
La Liga players
Real Madrid CF players
Racing de Santander managers
Pontevedra CF managers
Paris FC managers
AC Ajaccio managers
FC Lorient managers
AC Avigonnnais managers
Real Madrid Castilla managers
Real Jaén managers
French expatriate footballers
French expatriate football managers
French expatriate sportspeople in Spain
Expatriate footballers in Spain
Expatriate football managers in Spain